Tafsir Shobar is a 19th-century Arabic exegesis of the Qur'an written by Sayyid Abdullah b. Muhammad Rida Hosseini Kazimi (1775–1826CE). The author was born in Najaf, Iraq, spent some time in Shiraz, Iran and died in the city of Kazemain, Iraq. His work follows a traditional methodology for exegesis. The book has been called Safat Al-Tafäsir, Al-Javäher Al-Samin Fi Tafsir Al-Qur'an Al-Mobin, Al-Kabir, Al-Vasit, and Al-Vajiz.

Structure
The book is in two volumes. The first volume covers from the beginning of Qur'an up to Surah Yusuf. The second volume starts at Surah ar-Ra'd and goes through to the end of Qur'an. A copy of the manuscript from the author's time is available in Qom in Sayyid Mar'ashi Najafi's library.

See also
Qur'an
Qur'anic exegesis (Tafsir)
List of Qur'anic exegesis

References

External links
 Tafsir Shobar in Arabic
 Mirza Alizadeh, "Introduction to Tafsir Shobar," Journal of Quranic Sciences, Summer 1996(Farsi)
 Babak Farzaneh, Master's thesis abstract on Tafsir Shobar (Farsi), Tehran 2005 Azad University

Shia tafsir